The USC Annenberg School for Communication and Journalism comprises a School of Communication and a School of Journalism at the University of Southern California (USC). Starting July 2017, the school’s Dean is Willow Bay, succeeding Ernest J. Wilson III. The graduate program in Communications is consistently ranked first according to the QS World University Rankings.

History 
The Annenberg School for Communication and Journalism was established in 1971 through the support of United States Ambassador Walter H. Annenberg. The USC Department of Communication Arts and Sciences and the School of Journalism became part of USC Annenberg in 1994.

Schools

School of Communication 
The USC Annenberg School of Communication is the school's center for general communications. It offers degrees from undergraduate to doctorates. Its current director is Sarah Banet-Weiser, who took over from Larry Gross in 2014. It offers the following degrees: B.A. (communication), M.A. (global communication/global media, communication management, public diplomacy, strategic public relations, digital social media, communication data science), Ph.D. (communication).

School of Journalism 
Annenberg's School of Journalism's director is Willow Bay, who joined in 2014. It offers the following degrees: Degrees offered: B.A. (journalism, public relations), M.A. (journalism, specialized journalism, strategic public relations).

Centers
 The USC Annenberg Center for Public Relations: Connecting the PR industry with students and academics to define the future of the profession and develop its future leaders.
 The Annenberg Networks Network: social network studies and computational social science. 
 The Annenberg Research Network on International Communication: research on international communication issues.
 The Johnson Communication Leadership Center provides undergraduate scholarships and conducts research on the role of African-Americans in the media.
The Center on Communication Leadership & Policy sponsors research and organizes courses, programs and symposia. The center's director is the former dean of USC Annenberg Geoffrey Cowan.
 The Center for the Digital Future "communication technology and mass media, and their impact on individuals, communities and nations.Includes the research project: Surveying the Digital Future

 The USC U.S.-China Institute: public discussion of the U.S.-China relationship through policy-relevant research, graduate and undergraduate training, and professional development programs for teachers, journalists, and officials. It produces public events, documentary films, and magazines. It was established in 2006 by USC President C.L. "Max" Nikias (then provost). In fall 2011, it became part of the USC Annenberg School for Communication and Journalism,
 The USC Center on Public Diplomacy, in partnership with the USC College's School of International Relations: government, corporate and non-state actors engagement with foreign audiences. Includes the: U.S. Canada Fulbright Chair in Public Diplomacy
 The Haptics Lab: integrating the sense of touch into human/computer interactions, is supported by the Integrated Media Systems Center, a National Science Foundation Engineering Research Center.
 The Metamorphosis Project: the transformations of urban community under the forces of globalization, new communication technologies and population diversity.
 The Norman Lear Cente: convergence of entertainment, commerce and society.
 The Annenberg Innovation Lab
 The USC Annenberg Institute of Sports, Media & Society

Professional education
 Knight Digital Media Center
 USC Annenberg/California Endowment Health Journalism Fellowships
 USC Annenberg/Getty Arts Journalism Program
 Institute for Justice and Journalism
 NEA (National Endowment for the Arts) Arts Journalism Institute in Theater and Musical Theater

Awards presented 
 Everett M. Rogers Award for Achievement in Entertainment Education
 Selden Ring Award for Investigative Reporting
 USC Annenberg Walter Cronkite Award for Excellence in Television Political Journalism
 USC Annenberg Health Journalism Fellowships, one for California journalists and one opened nationally at Center for Health Journalism funded by The California Endowment

Publications
International Journal of Communication, Editors: Manuel Castells, Larry Gross
Online Journalism Review, Editor: Robert Niles (ceased operation on June 16, 2008)
"The Image of the Journalist in Popular Culture (IJPC) Journal, Editors: Joe Saltzman, Laura Castaneda, and Richard Ness.

Student activities

Students are active with USC's student-run newspaper, the Daily Trojan; USC Annenberg's online news publication, Neon Tommy; USC Annenberg's nightly television newscast, Annenberg TV News; its TV newsmagazine Impact; Radio show Annenberg Radio News; Community digital journalism news website focusing on South Los Angeles. Annenberg Media also reports on student art culture, covering music groups such as Kid Hastings, SILQQ, and others.  
USC Annenberg is also home to student chapters of the Radio-Television News Directors Association and Public Relations Student Society of America. Students also run an in-house public relations agency that works with non-profit and small business clients.

Annenberg TV News airs Monday through Thursday at 6 p.m. on Trojan Vision. Students are responsible for reporting local, national and international news and producing the newscast live on air.

Careers
USC Annenberg's career development office provides services exclusively to USC Annenberg students and alumni.

Facilities
Resources include a fully digital three-camera broadcast studio, a television newsroom, a digital lab equipped with Adobe Premiere nonlinear video editing systems, four computer classrooms and the Experiential Learning Center. Fourteen classrooms feature multimedia display capabilities. Professional media and research software applications are installed on more than 200 computers available for student use.

International programs
USC Annenberg offers study-abroad opportunities for undergraduate students in Amsterdam, Auckland, Buenos Aires, Christchurch, Hong Kong, London, Singapore and Sydney. Graduate journalism and public relations students may complete summer internships in Cape Town, Hong Kong and London, and public diplomacy students have the opportunity to complete summer internships abroad. USC Annenberg offers a joint MA/MSc graduate degree program in global communication with the London School of Economics & Political Science.

Notable faculty members and instructors

Communication
 Jonathan Aronson
 Manuel Castells 
 Geoffrey Cowan
 Nicholas J. Cull 
 G. Thomas Goodnight 
 Derrick Hall
 Henry Jenkins 
 Josh Kun  
 A. Michael Noll 
 Robert Scheer  
 Jonathan Taplin
 Douglas Thomas
 Ernest J. Wilson III

Journalism
 Henry Jenkins
 Josh Kun
 Diane Winston
 Mary Murphy
 Joe Saltzman, professor
 Dan Birman, professor of professional practices

Admissions statistics

Undergraduate
Total undergraduate enrollment (Fall 2015): 1,440

Freshman class statistics

Graduate
Total graduate enrollment (Fall 2007): 546

Graduate program statistics

Finances and fundraising
 Annual operating budget, 2007–08: $49 million
 Endowment (as of July 1, 2007): $228 million
 Undergraduate tuition & fees (with living expenses): $45,810 ($58,403)
 USC undergraduates receiving financial aid: 60%

See also
 Annenberg Center for Communication at USC
 Annenberg School for Communication at the University of Pennsylvania

References

External links
USC Annenberg School for Communication website
Online Journalism Review website
USC Annenberg TV News website
USC, Annenberg School for Communications and Journalism from The Annenberg Foundation Website

Communication and Journalism
USC
Educational institutions established in 1971
Annenberg
Articles containing video clips